Sylvester Laflin "Pat" Weaver Jr. (December 21, 1908 – March 15, 2002) was an American broadcasting executive who was president of NBC between 1953 and 1955. He has been credited with reshaping commercial broadcasting's format and philosophy as radio gave way to television as America's dominant home entertainment. His daughter is actress Sigourney Weaver.

Early life and education
Born in Los Angeles, Sylvester Laflin Weaver Jr. was the son of Eleanor Isabel (née Dixon) and Sylvester Laflin Weaver. His brother was comedian Doodles Weaver.

Weaver was of Scottish descent (possibly Clan MacFarlane), as well as of Ulster-Scots, Dutch and early New England ancestry. He was related to Matthew Laflin, an American manufacturer of gunpowder, businessman, philanthropist, and an early pioneer of Chicago. Both were descendants of Charles Laflin, a gunpowder manufacturer, who came to America in 1740 from Ulster, Ireland, settling at Oxford, Massachusetts. Charles Laflin and his family were living at Oxford when he purchased land in 1749 in Westfield.

Weaver graduated from Dartmouth College in 1930, where he was a member of Phi Beta Kappa and Phi Kappa Psi fraternity.

He served in the United States Navy during WWII from 1942 to 1945.

Career
Weaver worked for the Young & Rubicam advertising agency during the golden age of radio. In the mid-1930s he produced Fred Allen's Town Hall Tonight radio show, and he then supervised all the  agency's radio programming. NBC hired him in 1949 to challenge CBS's programming lead. At NBC, Weaver established many operating practices that became standard for network television. He introduced the practice of networks producing their own television programming, then selling advertising time during the broadcasts. Prior to that, ad agencies usually created each show for a particular client. Because commercial announcements could now more easily be sold to more than one company sponsor for each program, a single advertiser pulling out would not necessarily threaten a program.

Weaver created Today in 1952, followed by Tonight Starring Steve Allen (1954), Home (1954) with Arlene Francis and Wide Wide World (1955), hosted by Dave Garroway. There are those who dispute Weaver's credit for The Tonight Show, including hosts Steve Allen and Jack Paar but, during a broadcast of The Tonight Show Starring Johnny Carson, both the host and his guest Dick Cavett stated that Weaver created both Today and The Tonight Show. Years later, Paar said, "He didn't invent programs, but wrote great memos."

He believed that broadcasting should educate as well as entertain. He required NBC shows to include at least one sophisticated cultural reference or performance per installment — including a segment of a Verdi opera adapted to the comic style of Sid Caesar and Imogene Coca's groundbreaking Your Show of Shows. Weaver did not ignore NBC Radio, either. In 1955, as network radio was dying, Weaver helped revive it with NBC Monitor, a weekend-long magazine-style programming block that featured an array of news, music, comedy, drama, sports, and anything that could be broadcast within magazine style, with rotating advertisers and some of the most memorable names in broadcast journalism, entertainment and sports.

He was the developer of the magazine style of advertising whereby sponsors would purchase blocks of time (typically one to two minutes) in a show, rather than sponsor an entire show. This style suited the networks. Like a magazine, a television network could now control what advertisements were being broadcast and no one advertiser could own exclusive rights to a particular show.

Advertisers and network executives agreed that radio audiences preferred live broadcasts to prerecorded shows. Weaver believed that ratings for radio had declined because listeners were tired of predictable, regularly scheduled shows. For NBC he advocated for television spectaculars, live, 90-minute special programs with high production values and costs. While some, like Peter Pan, were very successful, CBS's more traditional programming of regularly scheduled and prefilmed shows like I Love Lucy were more popular, less expensive, and could be rerun. NBC fired Weaver in August 1956; he never worked for another network.

NBC Monitor long outlived Weaver's tenure running the network. His successors (first, David Sarnoff's son, Robert; then, Robert Kintner) standardized the network's programming practices. In November 1960, years after leaving NBC, Weaver displayed his frustration with the network in an article in the Sunday edition of The Denver Post. What once was the Golden Age of Television in the early 1950s slowly diminished by the end of the decade into the early 1960s, when he claimed networks made a series of bad decisions. In the article he noted management problems within NBC, CBS, and ABC: "Television has gone from about a dozen forms to just two – news shows and the Hollywood stories. The blame lies in the management of NBC, CBS and ABC. Management doesn't give the people what they deserve. I don't see any hope in the system as it is."

Weaver proposed on at least two occasions a fourth television network (dubbed the "Pat Weaver Prime Time Network") that never came to fruition. He also lent his talents as a consultant for radio and television activities to Freedomland U.S.A., a New York City theme park, during its 1960 debut. He is featured in the book, Freedomland U.S.A.: The Definitive History (Theme Park Press, 2019).

In 1985, Pat Weaver was inducted into the Television Hall of Fame.

Personal life
Weaver married Elizabeth Inglis in 1942. She was born Desiree Mary Lucy Hawkins (daughter of Alan G. Hawkins and Margaret I. Hunt) on July 10, 1913, in Colchester, Essex, England; and died on August 25, 2007, in Santa Barbara, California. She made her screen debut in Borrowed Clothes (1934) as well as a number of small parts in some of Alfred Hitchcock's early movies. She reached the high point of her career when she co-starred with Bette Davis in William Wyler's movie The Letter. She retired from acting when she married in 1942. The couple had two children, Trajan Victor Charles Weaver and actress Sigourney Weaver (born Susan Alexandra Weaver).

Pat Weaver died in 2002 of natural causes at his home in Santa Barbara, at age 93.

Notes

References

Further reading
Hart, Dennis.  "Monitor (Take 2)", iUniverse, 2003.
Reed, William Field. The descendants of Thomas Durfee of Portsmouth, R.I., Washington, D.C., Gibson Bros. 1900.

External links

Television Heaven (brief bio)
Pat Weaver: Television Advertising Visionary (biographical essay)
"NBC (Radio) Monitor" tribute
Sylvester Weaver interviewed by Mike Wallace on The Mike Wallace Interview

1908 births
2002 deaths
Businesspeople from Los Angeles
People from Santa Barbara, California
American people of Scotch-Irish descent
American television executives
Dartmouth College alumni
Military personnel from California
Emmy Award winners
Peabody Award winners
NBCUniversal people
NBC executives
Presidents of NBC
20th-century American businesspeople